Thomas B. Mitchell (died 1876) was an American lawyer and politician from New York.

Life
He practiced law in Canajoharie.

He was a member of the New York State Senate (6th D.) from 1843 to 1846, sitting in the 66th, 67th, 68th and 69th New York State Legislatures. He was a delegate to the 1844 Democratic National Convention in Baltimore.

Afterwards he removed to Schenectady. He was Tempoarary Chairman of the Hard-Shell Democratic state convention, held in July 1854 at Syracuse.

Congressman William Mitchell (1807–1865) was his brother.

Sources
The New York Civil List compiled by Franklin Benjamin Hough (pages 134f and 143; Weed, Parsons and Co., 1858)
THE ADAMANTINE CONVENTION in NYT on July 13, 1854

Year of birth missing
1876 deaths
Democratic Party New York (state) state senators
People from Canajoharie, New York
Politicians from Schenectady, New York